Accokeek Furnace Archeological Site is a historic archaeological site located near Stafford, Stafford County, Virginia.  The Principio Company of Cecil County, Maryland, constructed the Accokeek Iron Furnace about 1726 on land leased from Augustine Washington, father of George Washington. After his death in 1743, his son Lawrence Washington inherited his interest in the company and furnace. When he died in 1752, his share descended to his brother Augustine Washington, Jr. Operations at this site ceased around 1753. A historical marker denoting this site is located on the grounds of Colonial Forge High School.

It was listed on the National Register of Historic Places in 1984.

References

Washington family
Archaeological sites on the National Register of Historic Places in Virginia
National Register of Historic Places in Stafford County, Virginia
1726 establishments in Virginia